Eliphalet J. Foss (1840–1922/1923) or E.J. Foss was an American photographer active in Boston, Massachusetts. He lived/worked on Tremont Row. He belonged to the Boston Photographic Association; contemporaries included Thomas Rice Burnham. Around 1880, his business was taken over by A.B. Eaton. Examples of Foss' work are in Harvard University, the Henry Ford Museum, and Massachusetts Historical Society. His wife was the elocutionist, Louise Woodworth Foss.

References

Further reading
  (includes enthusiastic description of Foss' studio and equipment)

American portrait photographers
1840 births
1920s deaths
Photographers from Massachusetts
Artists from Boston
19th century in Boston
19th-century American photographers